Greentree Corners (also Green Tree or Greentree Corner) is an unincorporated community in northern Turtlecreek Township, Warren County, Ohio, United States.  It is located at the intersection of State Route 741 and Greentree Road about one and one-half miles north of Otterbein, two miles south of Red Lion, and three miles northwest of Lebanon.

Greentree was first named Morristown, and under the latter name laid out in 1816 by one Mr. Morris. The present name is after the Green Tree Tavern (now a private residence).

References

Unincorporated communities in Warren County, Ohio
Unincorporated communities in Ohio